Stefania Careddu (born 13 January 1945) is an Italian retired film and stage actress.

Life and career 
Born in Bergamo, Careddu is the daughter of the writer Marianna Frigeni. She made her film debut in 1965, in a small role in Gianni Puccini's I soldi, and the following year she had her first role of weight in Nelo Risi's Andremo in città. After several supporting roles, including some Spaghetti Westerns in which she was credited as Kareen O'Hara, Careddu retired from acting.

Selected filmography
  I soldi (1965)
  Andremo in città (1966)
  Any Gun Can Play (1967)
  Don Juan in Sicily (1967)
  Your Turn to Die (1967)
  Johnny Hamlet (1968)
 Temptation (1968) : Danielle Laroche
  When Women Were Called Virgins (1972)
  Il marito in collegio (1977)

References

External links 
 

Italian film actresses
1945 births
Actors from Bergamo
Living people
Italian stage actresses
20th-century Italian actresses